Kettleby may refer to:

 Kettleby, Lincolnshire (also spelled Kettelby), England
 Kettleby, Ontario, Canada 
 Ab Kettleby, Leicestershire, England
 Eye Kettleby, near Melton Mowbray, Leicestershire, England